Estonian Ruhnu sheep are a breed of native domesticated sheep found on the small Estonian island of Ruhnu in the Gulf of Riga in the Baltic Sea.

The Estonian Ruhnu sheep population is thought to descend from sheep left on Ruhnu by Swedish-speaking inhabitants who settled on the island in the 14th century. 
In 1944, a population of 300 sheep was documented. The current population of the breed is around 30 animals. It is thought that Estonian Ruhnu sheep were originally raised for producing meat and wool.

Physical adaptations of the Estonian Ruhnu sheep population to seaside pastures and small paddocks suggests that these sheep have had a rather long period to adapt to their environment. Most of the small population of Ruhnu sheep are white or cream colored with greyish head and legs and some have a distinctive "badgerface" pattern. The ewes are polled, and approximately 10% of rams are horned.  The sheep have short or medium- length tails. Distinctive from many other breeds of sheep, some Estonian Ruhnu sheep have one or two beads under the jaw. The wool is double-coated and of two fibre types and it is generally used for making hand knitting yarn and clothing, such as sweaters. Adult rams reach a weight of a maximum of 80 kg (175 lb) and 50 kg (110 lbs) among the ewes.

Although there is considerable genetic variation in most of the northern European sheep breeds, Ruhnu sheep, as well as Roslag sheep and Dala Fur sheep (both originating in Sweden) exhibit the highest within-population inbreeding. While the Ruhnu breed was found to be less variable than other Baltic sheep breeds, indicating the need for a breed management plan to prevent further loss of genetic variation, the population size of around 30 sheep is listed as stable. All remaining Estonian Ruhnu sheep on the island live in one semimanaged existing flock, with several individual sheep living on the Estonian island of Kihnu.

References

Sheep breeds
Sheep breeds originating in Estonia
Ruhnu